Tripping Forward is a 2009 comedy film directed by Marcus Nash from a screenplay by Fogleman and Nash. It stars Chris Fogleman, William Gregory Lee and Amber Benson and features Ed Begley, Jr., Angela Kinsey and actress/model Sung Hi-Lee.

Plot
Ford Coleman (Chris Fogleman) is a young actor trying to start his career in Los Angeles.  His friend Tripp (William Gregory Lee) has already given up making it in the music business, and now takes drugs and lives off of Ford.  When Ford's money runs out, Tripp comes up with the idea of selling drugs to supermodels to make money, and Ford goes along so they won't be evicted, and he can keep taking acting classes from James Comey (Ed Begley, Jr.) with the girl of his dreams, Gwen (Amber Benson)

Cast
 Chris Fogleman as Ford Coleman
 William Gregory Lee as Tripp
 Amber Benson as Gwen
 John Kapelos as Vladdy
 Ed Begley Jr. as James Comey
 Billy Morrison as Sweaty Steve
 Angela Kinsey as Jennifer
 M. C. Gainey as Jim Rose, interviewer
 Sung Hi Lee as Crystal
 Ezra Buzzington as Joe, casting director.

Production and release
Tripping Forward film was shot on a budget of roughly $750,000.  It received its initial release at the Palm Beach International Film Festival on April 26, 2009 and was released on DVD on January 26, 2010.

References

External links
 
 
 

2009 comedy films
2009 films
2000s English-language films